The Open Source Hardware Association (OSHWA) is a non-profit organization that advocates for open-source hardware. It aims to act as a hub of open source hardware activity of all types while actively cooperating with other initiatives such as the TAPR Open Hardware License, open-source development groups at CERN, and the Open Source Initiative (OSI). It has also been active in promoting diversity and inclusive terminology within the open source hardware movement.

History
The OSHWA was established as an organization in June 2012 by engineer Alicia Gibb, who had been working on the Open Hardware Summit during graduate study. After some debate about trademark with the OSI, in 2012 the OSHWA and the OSI signed a co-existence agreement.

Open Source Hardware Summit
The Open Source Hardware Summit is the annual gathering organized by OSHWA for the open hardware community that takes place at a different location each year. The summit features presentations of projects and developments within the open hardware field from a diverse range of speakers. OSHWA offers the Ada Lovelace Fellowship that covers the costs of the summit to encourage women, LGBTA+ and/or other minorities to actively participate in open technology.

Open Source Hardware Certificate
In 2016 OSHWA announced its certification program for open-source hardware at the Open Hardware Summit in Portland, Oregon. The certification aims to offer a simple process for producers of open hardware to indicate that their products meet a uniform and well-defined standard for open-source compliance.

References

External links

Open-source hardware
Non-profit organizations based in Delaware
2013 establishments in Delaware
Information technology organizations based in North America
Intellectual property activism